Charholi Budruk, Pune is a planned neighbourhood in the city of Pune, India. Near in the suburbs of Lohegoan, Dhanori, Viman Nagar, Moshi, Dighi and Pimple Saudagar, the locality is a progressive residential area that attracts the newer population of the city. Charholi lies on the southern bank of the Indrayani river. The village was an old marketplace and has a long history. The suburb has evolved into a major metropolitan corridor for techies in Pimpari chainchwad, Pune. The infrastructure in terms of roads, internet and housing is very good. The village is famous for ancient Shri Wagheshwar Maharaj temple. Most of the people visit this temple for taking blessings for Lord Mahadev. Charholi budruk has a huge yatra event on the day of Mahashivratri during which a lot of people visit the village to enjoy the yatra. The majority surname population are Bhosale, Tapkir, Pathare, Kalje, Raskar, Burde, Kotwal, Dabhade. Mr Nitin Appa Kalje the resident of Charholi budruk served as first BJP ruled mayor of PCMC. Village also celebrates Shivjayanti, Shambhujayanti very joyfully. Most population residing is Hindu Maratha.
| North  = Dudulgoan(Pune)
| West   = Moshi (Pune)
| Center = Charholi Budruk
| South  = Dighi(Pune)
| East   = Lohegaon(Pune).
Neighbourhoods in Pune